Prumnopitys montana is a species of conifer in the family Podocarpaceae. It is found in Colombia, Ecuador, Peru, and Venezuela.

The Latin specific epithet montana refers to mountains or coming from mountains.

References

montana
Least concern plants
Trees of Peru
Trees of Colombia
Trees of Venezuela
Trees of Ecuador
Taxa named by Aimé Bonpland
Taxa named by Alexander von Humboldt
Taxonomy articles created by Polbot